is a Japanese manga series written and illustrated by Yoko Kamio. The story is set in Tokyo, Japan. It centers on students at the fictional "Eitoku Academy", an elite school for children from rich families. It tells the story of Tsukushi Makino, a girl from a middle class family, whose mother enrolled her in an elite high school to compete with the families from her husband's company. While at Eitoku, she encounters the F4, a gang of four young men who are children of Japan's wealthiest families, and who bully anyone that gets in their way.

Hana Yori Dango was serialized in Shueisha's bi-weekly  Japanese-language magazine Margaret magazine from October 1992 to September 2003. It was also serialized into 36 stand-alone volumes between 1992 and 2004, with an epilogue (issue #37) that came out in 2008. English translations of all 37 volumes were released between 2003-2009. It has also been published by Glénat in France and by Planeta DeAgostini in Spain.

Kamio began a sequel, titled Boys Over Flowers Season 2, in Shueisha's Shōnen Jump+ online magazine on February 15, 2015. In July 2006, a short story based on the manga was published in issue 15 of Margaret magazine. Another two-installment short story was published in January 2007. Both short stories were done by Yoko Kamio.

Volume list

References

External links
 

Chapters
Boys Over Flowers